The Hoosic River, also known as the Hoosac, the Hoosick (primarily in New York) and the Hoosuck (mostly archaic), is a  tributary of the Hudson River in the northeastern United States. The different spellings are the result of varying transliterations of the river's original Algonquian name. It can be translated either as "the beyond place" (as in beyond, or east of, the Hudson) or as "the stony place" (perhaps because the river's stony bottom is usually exposed except in spring, or perhaps because local soils are so stony).

The Hoosic River watershed is formed from tributaries originating in the Berkshire Hills of Massachusetts, the Green Mountains of Vermont, and the Taconic Mountains. The main (South) Branch of the river begins on the west slope of North Mountain and almost immediately fills the man-made Cheshire Reservoir in Berkshire County, Massachusetts. From there, the river flows north, west, and northwest, through the towns of Cheshire and Adams, the city of North Adams, and the town of Williamstown. It then travels through Pownal in the southwest corner of Vermont, after which it enters Rensselaer County, New York. There, it flows through the towns of Petersburgh and Hoosick, where it passes over a hydroelectric power dam in the village of Hoosick Falls. (There are also dams in Johnsonville, Valley Falls, and Schaghticoke.)

Tributaries

 North Branch Hoosic River
 Green River
 Little Hoosick River
 Walloomsac River - Native American name, also Wal-loom-sac
 Owl Kill 
 Wampecack Creek - Native American name, also Po-quam-pa-cak
 Tomhannock - Native American name, also Tom-he-nack
 Sunkouissa Creek - Native American name, also Sank-an-is-sick

See also
List of rivers of Massachusetts
List of rivers of New York
List of rivers of Vermont
Hudson–Hoosic Watershed

References

External links
 Hoosic River Watershed Association
 Hoosuck Chapter of Trout Unlimited
 Hoosic River Nature Trail in Williamstown

Tributaries of the Hudson River
Rivers of New York (state)
Rivers of Vermont
Rivers of Berkshire County, Massachusetts
Rivers of Washington County, New York
Rivers of Rensselaer County, New York
Rivers of Bennington County, Vermont
Rivers of Massachusetts
New York placenames of Native American origin
Vermont placenames of Native American origin